Legislative elections were held in Åland on 18 October 1987 to elect members of the Landstinget. The 30 members were elected for a four-year term by proportional representation.

Three new parties participated in the elections;  the conservative Non-aligned Coalition, the separatist Free Åland and the environmentalist Greens on Åland. After the next election in 1991, only the Non-Aligned Rally would still be active.

Following the elections, a change in the constitution provided for the establishment of a majority government. As a result, the Åland Centre, Liberals for Åland and Freeminded Co-operation parties formed a coalition government.

Results

References

External links
Parties and Elections in Europe
Legislative Assembly elections

Elections in Åland
1987 in Finland
Aland
October 1987 events in Europe